Rahul Rohilla (born 5 July 1996 in Haryana) is an Indian racewalker.

2020 Summer Olympics
Rohilla qualified for the Men's 20 km walk at the 2020 Olympics with a time of 1:20:26, finishing second in the qualifying event, and will represent India in the 2020 Summer Olympics in Tokyo. He finished 47th in the event.

References

Living people
1996 births
Indian male racewalkers
Athletes from Haryana
Athletes (track and field) at the 2020 Summer Olympics
Olympic athletes of India
21st-century Indian people